Dane Stuart Coles (born 10 December 1986) is a New Zealand rugby union player who plays as a hooker for the Hurricanes in Super Rugby and Wellington Lions in the Mitre 10 Cup. Coles has also played international rugby for New Zealand's All Blacks since 2012.

He was a key member of the 2015 Rugby World Cup winning team. He also Captained the Hurricanes to their maiden Super Rugby title in 2016.

He was widely regarded as one of the best hookers in the world at the height of his career and was a nominee for World Rugby Player of the Year in 2016.

Playing career

Early career
In 2012, Coles made his All Blacks debut against Scotland. He came on in the 62nd minute: New Zealand 51, Scotland 22. Coles made three more appearances off the bench in 2012, earning his first start for New Zealand in 2013 against France.

Coles scored his first try against South Africa in 2014 in a 25–27 loss and had also become a regular starter for New Zealand by 2014, supplanting long-serving All Black great Keven Mealamu from the starting XV.

Coles started in the knockout rounds of the 2015 Rugby World Cup, including the final against Australia, where the 34–17 victory saw New Zealand become the first team to win back-to-back World Cup titles. Following the World Cup, Hurricanes midfielder and Captain Conrad Smith announced that he would leave New Zealand for Pau in France. Smith's departure saw Coles named as the captain of the Hurricanes for 2016.

2016–2017
Of Ngāti Porou descent, Coles was awarded the Tom French Memorial Cup in 2016 as the Māori rugby player of the year. After scoring four tries that year, which made him the highest-scoring forward in the squad for 2016, Coles was also nominated for New Zealand Rugby Player of the Year and World Rugby Player of the Year earlier in 2016, losing both awards to Hurricanes teammate Beauden Barrett.

Coles played in the first three games of 2017 for the Hurricanes but after a concussion on 18 March, missed an extended period of time, including the drawn British and Irish Lions test series, losing his Hurricanes captaincy to dominant halfback TJ Perenara. Coles returned to play in the Super Rugby quarter final against the Brumbies, coming off the bench for Ricky Riccitelli in the Hurricanes dominant 35–16 victory. He started the following week semi final against the Lions, in which the Hurricanes lost.

After being concussed again, Coles missed the first Bledisloe Cup test of 2017 before finally returning to test rugby the following week, earning his 50th test in a 35–29 win against Australia in the second Bledisloe Cup test. Coles was retained as a starting player for the rest of the 2017 Rugby Championship despite the incredible form of Codie Taylor who had started against the Lions in his absence. Coles scored a try in the 38–18 win against France but was subbed off after 20 minutes, due to tearing his ACL, in what was only his 11th professional rugby game of 2017.

2018–2019
Coles missed all of Super Rugby in 2018 due to his ACL injury. Coles was expected to be back in time for the playoffs but was physically unable to run until June. England international, Brad Shields, captained the Hurricanes in 2018, in Coles' absence. After finally recovering from injury at the back-end of the 2018 Mitre 10 Cup, Coles, as well as his teammate Nepo Laulala were both recalled for New Zealand after a long injury-enforced absence. Coles played four tests for New Zealand on the end-of-year tour, but having been surpassed as the first-choice hooker by Codie Taylor, was benched for the All Blacks against England and Ireland.

Style of play
Coles is a modern-game hooker who, without sacrificing mass or power for breakdown phases, is also extremely mobile across the field and capable of producing high-quality passing. Such set of skills, traditionally unusual in a front-rower, allow him to join setplays as an extra center and even to deliver impressively fast runs on the wing. His effectiveness has been praised after his international debut, "with many experts describing Coles as having 'revolutionised' the role of the modern hooker".

References

External links

Hurricanes profile
Wellington Lions profile

Living people
New Zealand rugby union players
New Zealand international rugby union players
Hurricanes (rugby union) players
Wellington rugby union players
1986 births
Rugby union hookers
Māori All Blacks players
People from Paraparaumu
Ngāti Porou people
Rugby union players from the Wellington Region